William Henry Fitzroy, 6th Duke of Grafton (5 August 1819 – 21 May 1882), styled Viscount Ipswich until 1847 and Earl of Euston between 1847 and 1863, was a British peer and Liberal Party politician.  He was born in London and educated at Harrow, and after went to the Royal Military College, Sandhurst.

He was the son of Henry FitzRoy, 5th Duke of Grafton and his wife Mary Caroline Berkeley, who were married on 20 June 1812 in Lisbon. At the time his father was an officer fighting with the Duke of Wellington in the Peninsular War.

At the 1847 general election he was elected unopposed as a Member of Parliament (MP) for the borough of Thetford in Norfolk, a seat held by his father from 1834 to 1841. He was returned unopposed at the next three general elections, and held the seat until he succeeded to his father's peerage in 1863.

Grafton married the Honourable Marie Anne Louise Baring (18 November 1833 – 8 April 1928), the daughter of Francis Baring, 3rd Baron Ashburton, on 10 February 1858. He spent the winter and spring each year at Hyères because he and his wife both suffered from ill health.

In 1860 he was appointed lieutenant-colonel in command of the 1st Administrative Battalion of Northamptonshire Rifle Volunteers.

He died childless in 1882, aged 62, in London and was succeeded as Duke of Grafton by his younger brother, Augustus.

Arms

References

External links 
 

1819 births
1882 deaths
People educated at Harrow School
Graduates of the Royal Military College, Sandhurst
106
Earls of Arlington
Liberal Party (UK) MPs for English constituencies
UK MPs 1847–1852
UK MPs 1852–1857
UK MPs 1857–1859
UK MPs 1859–1865
UK MPs who inherited peerages
W
William
Northamptonshire Regiment officers
Volunteer Force officers